Chhindwara district is one of the major districts of Madhya Pradesh state of India, and Chhindwara town is the district headquarters. Chhindwara is the largest district in Madhya Pradesh with an area of 11,815 square km. The district is part of Jabalpur division.

The name Chhindwara has been derived from the word Chhind, the local name of a tree found commonly in the district. Chhindwara district was formed on 1 November 1956.

It is on the southwest region of the Satpura Range. It is spread from 21.28 to 22.49 deg. North (latitude) and 78.40 to 79.24 deg. East (longitude) and spread over an area of 11,815 km². This district is bound by the plains of Nagpur district (in Maharashtra State) on the south, Hoshangabad and Narsinghpur districts on the north, Betul district on the west and Seoni district on the east.

History
The early history of Chhindwara is not well-known. Based on copper-plate inscriptions found in Chhindwara and neighbouring Seoni districts, it was speculated that the Vakatakas were in power here until the 3rd century CE. By the late 7th century their power faded and the dynasty was ruled by the Gaulis. The southern part of the district, like the Nagpur plain to the south, was ruled by the Rashtrakutas for several centuries. A copper plate inscription from the 9th century CE gives a village named Mohagrama to a Kannada Brahmin, which some scholars have identified as Mohgaon in southern Chhindwara.

Until the advent of the Gond dynasties in the 14th century, Chhindwara's history is scant. The western part of the district could have been part of the Kherla kingdom in nearby Betul. Deogarh on the Chhindwara plateau is believed to be the last seat of Gauli power. According to legend, founder of the Gond dynasty, Jatha slew and supplanted the Gauli chiefs Ransur and Ghamsur during a temple festival. Briefly the Deogarh kingdom was the most powerful of the four Gond states, but was quickly made into a tribute-paying sarkar under the Berar subah of the Mughals. The Deogarh sarkar included parts of Chhindwara and Nagpur districts. King Bakht Bulund was most powerful in the dynasty and he has adopted Islam as his religion during the rule of Emperor Aurangzeb. By 1720, under Bakht Buland's leadership, Deogarh was largely independent from Mughal control. Bakht Buland mainly resided in Deogarh and conquered large territories from the kingdoms of Mandla and Chanda. When Aurangzeb's army was faltering, Bakht Buland took the opportunity to attack Mughal territory on both sides of the Wardha river. He and his sons encouraged the migration of many non-tribal cultivators to the Berar plains and the plateau region. After his son Chand Sultan's death, one of his illegitimate sons claimed the throne and his widow called the Marathas for aid. The Marathas conquered Deogarh and it became the territory of the Bhonsles of Nagpur.

On 17 September 1803, the British East India Company had taken over this kingdom by defeating Raghoji II Bhonsle, starting the British rule. Nagpur state continued to administer the territory until in 1853 it was annexed as part of the Doctrine of Lapse. After the 1857 rebellion, Chhindwara district became part of the Nerbudda Division of the Central Provinces and Berar, which became the state of Madhya Bharat (later Madhya Pradesh) after India's independence in 1947. After Independence, Nagpur was made the capital of Chhindwara District, and on 1 November 1956, when Maharashtra was formed and took Nagpur, this district was re-constituted with Chhindwara as the capital.

Geography
Geographically, Chhindwara district can be divided into three main regions:
 The western region consists two major towns: Junnardeo and Parasia;
 The central region consists of Chhindwara, southern part of Amarwara region, and northern part of Sausar region. It is a plateau region.
 The northern region is in the highest part of the Satpura Range, and covers a small portion of the plains of the Narmada valley.

There are five major rivers which flow through the district — the Kanhan, the Pench, the Jam, the Kulbehra, the Shakkar and the Doodh.

The Kanhan River flows in a southern direction through the western parts of Chhindwara Tehsil and enters the Wenganga River. The Jam River flows mostly through the Sausar region and joins with the Kanhan River. The Pench River flows in the border areas of Chhindwara and Seoni districts and mixes with the Kanhan River in Nagpur District. The Kulbehra River starts at Umreth and flows through Chhindwara and Mohkhed and joins with Pench River.

Over a third of the district, around 4212.556 km² of the district is covered under forest. Bamboo, teak, harra, saalbeej, and tendu patta are the major commercially harvested forest products.

Administration
The district is divided into 13 tehsils:
 Amarwara 
Bichhua
 Chand 
Chourai
 Harrai
 Junnardeo 
Mohkhed
 Pandhurna 
Parasia
 Sausar 
Tamia
Umreth
 Chhindwara

11 Development Blocks: Chhindwara, Parasia, Junnardeo, Damua, Tamia, Amarwara, Chourai, Bichhua, Harrai, Mohkhed, Sausar and Pandhurna.

There is one Nagar Nigam (Chhindwara), 8 Nagar Palikas (Parasia, Junnardeo, Damua, Bichhua, Pandhurna, Sausar, Amarwara, Chourai), 9 Nagar Panchayats (Chandameta-Butaria, Newton Chikhli Kalan, Chand, Harrai, Mohgaon, Chourai, Bichhua, Lodhikheda and Piplanarayanwar). Apart from this there are eleven small towns (Umranala, Dighawani, Jata Chhapar, Iklehra, Pagara, Kali Chhapar, Damua, Pala Chourai, Bhamodi, Ambada and Barkuhi).

Demographics

According to the 2011 census Chhindwara District has a population of 2,090,922, This gives it a ranking of 218th in India (out of a total of 640). Its population growth rate over the decade 2001-2011 was 13.03%. Chhindwara has a sex ratio of 966 females for every 1000 males, and a literacy rate of 72.21%. 24.16% of the population lives in urban areas. Scheduled Castes and Scheduled Tribes made up 11.11% and 36.82% of the population respectively. The main Scheduled Tribes are Gonds and Mawasi Korkus. Gonds make up 80% of the total Scheduled Tribe population and over 30% of the district overall.

There are 1,984 villages in the district, out of which 1,903 villages are inhabited. It is divided into 19 Revenue Circles, 319 Patwari Halkas. There are 808 Panchayats in the district. Chhindwara is the Parliamentary Constituency in the district and there are eight assembly segments (Junnardeo, Chhindwara, Parasia, Damua, Amarwara, Chourai, Sausar and Pandhurna). As per Census 2001 the population of Chhindwara town was 1,22,309 and of the district is 18,48,882 with a population density of 156 people per km². There are 953 females for every 1000 males.

The sex ratio of rural Chhindwara is more (962) than that of urban Chhindwara (926). As per Census 2001, the average literacy rate of the district was 66.03%, which is above the average of the MP state's 64.08%. The literacy rate in the rural area of the district is 60.76% and that of urban area is 81.46%.

Hindus are 92.01%, Muslims are 4.82% and Buddhists are 1.17%. Other religions (mainly tribal traditions) are 1.23%.

Languages

At the time of the 2011 Census of India, 79.97% of the population in the district spoke Hindi, 10.32% Marathi, 5.52% Gondi, 1.75% Korku and 1.44% Pawari as their first language.

Hindi is the primary language throughout the district. The local dialect is a variant of western Hindi related to Bagheli. Pawari is a name for a dialect of this type spoken by the Pawars. Marathi is the dominant language in the regions of Pandhurna and Sausar. There are several known Maharashtra mandals that keep Marathis connected throughout. Gondi was formerly spoken by over 30% of the population in 1931, and over 75% of Gonds. This percentage has decreased rapidly as most Gonds have shifted to Hindi. Today, it is only spoken by shrinking minorities in Junnardeo, Mokhed, Pandhurna, Sausar and Bicchua tehsils and has vanished everywhere else. Korku, primarily the Mawasi dialect, is mainly spoken in Mokhed and Sausar tehsils and is experiencing a similar steep decline. In Patalkot, Tamia tehsil, is spoken the poorly-known Bharia language, an unclassified Indo-Aryan language. All three tribal languages are highly endangered.

Villages
 

Delakhari

Climate
Chhindwara has a subtropical climate bordering tropical wet and dry climate. Like most of north India, it has a hot, dry summer (April–June) followed by monsoon rains (July–September) and a cool and relatively dry winter. Average annual rainfall is 1,183 mm. Minimum temperature during winter is 4 to 6 degrees Celsius while maximum temperature during summer is 38 to 42 degrees Celsius.

Media
Newspapers: Chhindwara has a few print publications which include Hindi newspapers such as, Dainik Bhaskar, Lokmat Samachar, Patrika, Divya Express and a recent web publication called news4india.

Educational Institutions

Universities

 Raja Shankar Shah University, Chhindwara 
 G H Raisoni University, Saikheda

Colleges

Some colleges - 
 Government Autonomous PG College, Chhindwara
 Shri Shri Laxmi Narayan Government Pench Valley PG College, Parasia, District - Chhindwara
 Government Polytechnic College, Khirsadoh, District - Chhindwara

Schools

Some schools - 
 Government Adarsh Multipurpose School of Excellence, Chhindwara
 Shri Nandlal Sood Government School of Excellence, Junnardeo, District - Chhindwara
 Jawahar Navodaya Vidyalaya Singori, Chhindwara
 Kendriya Vidyalaya (Chhindwara, Junnardeo, Barkuhi)
 Kanhan Valley School Dungariya, District - Chhindwara
Delhi Public School, Chhindwara

Other Institutes

Some other institutions - 
 Government Industrial Training Institute, Chhindwara (NCVT) 
 Government Industrial Training Institute, Junnardeo, District - Chhindwara (SCVT)

Industries
Following are few recognizable industries that have contributed to the industrial development of Chhindwara:

Hindustan Unilever:—

Hindustan Unilever Limited is a multinational company, originally from England. Earlier this company's name was Hindustan Lever Limited. Chhindwara Hindustan Unilever Limited is in village Lahgadua, 5 km from Chhindwara. This company completed 75 years in 2008. There are 210 workers in Hindustan Unilever, who work in three shifts. The Chhindwara factory produces three main products: Rin washing soap, Wheel washing powder, and Surf Excel washing powder. It is the only factory of Hindustan Unilever in Madhya Pradesh. In 2007 the production was 70,000 units.

Raymond Group: —

The Raymond Chhindwara plant, set up in 1991, is a state-of-the-art integrated manufacturing facility located 65 km from Chhindwara. This plant has achieved a record production capacity of 14.65 million meters, giving it the distinction of being the single largest integrated worsted suiting unit in the world.

Spices Park:—

India's first spice park was opened in Chhindwara on 25 February 2009. The first in a series of seven parks planned by the Spices Board is being set up with an investment of Rs 20 cr. The initial phase of the park consists of a Garlic Dehydration Plant set up by the Spices Board and a Steam Sterilization Unit set up by STCL Ltd., a public sector company. KITCO are the technical consultants for the project.

Nakoda Group:—

This group is Medium scale and fast growing industrial group of Chhindwara. Unit exist in Borgaon Industrial Area near Raymond Group. Leaded By Mr. Mayank Kothari and Mr. Ritesh Jain this group is expanding and raising job opportunity for local public and have given job to more than 200 People in last 3 years.

Amongst other large scale industries are Super Pack (Bajaj) at Village Sawli near Sausar, Bhansali Engineering Polymers at village Satnur near Sausar, P.B.M. Polytex Ltd. at village Borgaon near Sausar and Suryawanshi Spinning Mills at village Rajna near Pandhurna.

Coal mines
Junnardeo, about 50 km from Chhindwara, is the head office of the Kanhan area of WCL. It has Asia's largest coal wash plant. It has around 15 coal mines in the Kanhan area. It has a big railway coal transportation and its own importance in railways.

Parasia, about 30 km from Chhindwara, is known as the "Coal Mines Belt". There were 24 mines in this area, of which 20 mines are still working. The principal mines are Eklehara Mines, Barkuhi Mines, Chandameta Mines, Newton Mines, Donger Chikhali Mines, Mahadev Puri Mines. Ravanwara Mines, Ravanwara Khash, Vishnu Puri 11 No., Vishnu Puri 12 No., Chhinda Mines, Setiya Mines, Shivpuri Mines, Shivpuri Mines, Chhury Mines, Mathani Mines, Thisgora Mines, Nahariya Mines, Pench Mines, and Urdhan Project.

Tourism
Following Prominent Tourist Spots in the District. The unique fair of stone Gotmaar mela of Pandhurna is also attractive for the tourist all around the world.

Kukdikhapa Waterfall
Lilahi/Dhanora Waterfall
Patalkot (Valley)
Tamia Hills
Junnardeo Hills
Junnardeo Pahali Payari (Siddh Peeth)
Hinglaj Mata Mandir, Ambada (Shakti Peeth)
Chhota Mahadev Caves
Deogarh Fort
Harrai Tribal Museum
Jam Sawli Hanuman Mandir
Ardhnarishwar Jyotirlinga, Mohgaon Haveli
Shashthi Mata Mandir, Kapurda
Banjari Mata Mandir
Girja Maai Mandir, Tamia
Khedapati Mata Mandir, Chandameta
Mandir-Masjid, Eklehra
Chandshah Vali Dargah
Pandhurna Gotmaar Mela (Fair)
Kaliraat Mela (Fair)
Raini Dham / Meghnath Dham (7days Fair)
Anhoni Hot Water Spring
Sillewani Valley
Jilhari Ghat, District - Chhindwara
Lodheshwar Mahadev Mandir, Damua
Maa Kali Chausath Yogini Mandir, Dungariya

Railway Station's

Major railways station's in Chhindwara District :

Pataleshwara
Pataleshwara is a famous temple in Chhindwara. This is a Lord Shiva temple where the Shivratri Mela is held. In Chhindwara a shivling find out in "Ground". This shivling was seen before 250 years.

Pench National Park
The Pench National Park or Pench Tiger Reserve is named after the Pench River, which flows from north to south through the reserve in the southern reaches of the Satpura hill ranges in the Seoni and Chhindwara districts of Madhya Pradesh. The terrain is undulating, with most of the area covered by small hill ranges, steeply sloping on the sides. The reserve is in an area that holds a significant place in the natural history of Central India.

The description of its landscape, flora, and fauna has appeared in wildlife books dating back to the 17th century. Books written in the 19th and early 20th century by naturalists such as Captain J. Forsyth and Rudyard Kipling's Jungle Book explicitly present a detailed panorama of this tract.

References

External links

 Chhindwara City
 Chhindwara District

Chhindwara district
Districts of Madhya Pradesh
Coal mining districts in India
1956 establishments in Madhya Pradesh